Poola Rangadu is a 2012 Indian Telugu-language action comedy film written and directed by Veerabhadram. The film stars Sunil and Isha Chawla. Atchi Reddy has produced the film under Max India banner.

Plot
Ranga (Sunil) leads a happy and normal life with his family members. One day two men offer him to buy 30 acres of land in partnership with Ranga. Ranga, who is unaware of the risk, agrees to the offer. He sells his home which was being kept for his younger sister's marriage to buy the land.
The land which he buys is between 300 acres on either side belonging to Konda Reddy (Dev Gill) and Lala Goud (Pradeep Rawat,) both local criminals in that village who would kill whoever tried to buy the land.
Ranga leaves his house and reaches the village to see his newly bought land. He doesn't yet know he got cheated by buying land which is under litigation. Soon after arriving the village, he meets his old friend Vasu (Ali), Vasu , he warns Ranga to leave the place and forget about his land, revealing the danger about that place. Ranga then decides to sell his land and get the money for his sister's marriage. Lala Goud's daughter Anitha falls in love with Ranga. However, Ranga is unaware that Anitha loves him. There is flashback revealing Konda Reddy's sister eloping with Lala Goud who was a servant under Konda Reddy's father before him. Now angry, Konda Reddy wants to take revenge on Lala Goud by marrying his daughter with the intent of torturing her.
The story continues and in the end Ranga battles against Konda Reddy and wins his love and the land.

Cast
 Sunil as Ranga
 Isha Chawla as Anitha
 Kota Srinivasa Rao as Ranga's father
 Dev Gill as Konda Reddy (Anitha's Uncle)
 Pradeep Rawat as Lala Goud, Anitha's father
 Ali as Vasu, Ranga's friend
 Sumithra as Anitha's maternal grandmother
 Satyam Rajesh as Bosu, Ranga's friend
 Prudhviraj as Eedara Gavvaraju "Eega" (Money Lender)
 Duvvasi Mohan as Eedara Gavvaraju's henchman
 Sudha as Ranga's mother
 Pragathi as Lakshmi ( Konda Reddy's Sister), (Anitha's Mother)
Raghu Babu as Thalapathy (Lala Goud's Assistant)
 Arundhati Aravind as Malli
 Manava Koteshwar Rao as Event Organizer of Pochamma Thalli Fair

Box office
After the film ran for 50 days on 7 April 2012 in notable centres it had collected box office takings of  500 million. Movie makers have released a press note in this regard. The film has completed 100 days on 27 May 2012.

Soundtrack
The audio of the film was released on 17 January 2012 and the launch was held at Hotel Katriya in Hyderabad on same day. The soundtrack was composed by Anoop Rubens and it consists of six songs. Lyrics for two songs were written by Kandikonda and one song by Anantha Sriram and another by Ramajogayya Sastry and remaining by Vanamali, Chandrabose.

Accolades

References

External links
 

2012 films
Indian comedy films
2010s Telugu-language films
2012 comedy films
Telugu remakes of Malayalam films